Rudy Yonson (born 20 September 1963) is a former Australian rules footballer who played for  Sydney in the Victorian Football League (VFL).

Australian rules football career
Yonson made his VFL debut in Sydney's 1985 round 15 loss to Hawthorn at Princes Park. He scored two goals in that game. He played a further two games for Sydney – the round 16 match against Collingwood at the SCG (where he scored another goal) and the round 17 match against Footscray at the Western Oval.

Later life
Yonson currently runs a real estate business in Albury.

References

1963 births
Australian rules footballers from New South Wales
Sydney Swans players
North Albury Football Club players
Living people